The Last Suit is a 2017 Argentine-Spanish-Polish dramatic film written and directed by Pablo Solarz, starring Miguel Ángel Solá, Ángela Molina and Martín Piroyansky. The film tells a story that explores old age, generational differences, judaism and the wounds that remain open from World War II.

Plot 
Abraham Bursztein, an 88-year-old Jewish tailor, who even has great-grandchildren, found out his daughters' intention to sell his apartment and send him to a nursing home. Later he decides to travel from Buenos Aires to Łódź in Poland, where he sets out to find his old friend Piotrek, who saved him from certain death at the end of World War II, and then helped him escape to Argentina. Abraham intends to keep his promise of returning one day and to also give him the last suit he ever made, to which the film title alludes.

What follows is a series of entanglements with road-movie elements that in its heart hides important themes. Despite his constant grumpiness and mistreatments, Abraham will always find someone willing to help him. In Spain, Maria (Angela Molina) will assist him after losing his money in a robbery, and to reconnect with his estranged daughter. In Germany, Ingrid (Julia Beerhold) will support him in making peace with the country and its people.

The magic of the story will even make a Polish nurse named Gosia (Olga Bołądź) who he barely knows; accompany him on the last leg of his journey to Łódz.

Cast 
 Miguel Ángel Solá as Abraham
 Ángela Molina as María
 Olga Bołądź as Gosia
 Julia Beerhold as Ingrid
 Martín Piroyansky as Leo
 Jan Mayzel as Piotrek
 Maciej Grubich as Abraham (19-year-old)
 Michal Sikorski	as Piotrek (19-year-old)
 Mora Starosta as Sheine (girl narrator)
 Leticia Gurfinkel as Dalia (Tarna's grand daughter)
 José Luciano González as taxi driver
 Norma Argentina as Paulina (Abraham's assistant)
 Cristóbal Pinto as migration officer
 Natalia Verbeke as Claudia (Abraham's preferred daughter)
 Noemí Frenkel as Shoshana (Abraham's daughter)

Festivals & Awards 

 Academy of Motion Picture Arts and Sciences of Argentina (2018)
 Nominated: Best Actor (Miguel Ángel Solá)
 Nominated: Best Costume Design (Montse Sancho)
 Argentinean Film Critics Association Awards (2019)
 Nominated: Silver Condor for Best Actor (Miguel Ángel Solá)
 Atlanta Jewish Film Festival (2018)
 Winner: Audience Award for Best Narrative Feature
 Havana Film Festival New York (2018)
 Winner: Havana Star Prize for Best Actor (Miguel Ángel Solá)
 Miami Film Festival (2018)
 Winner: Audience Award for Best Feature Film
 Philadelphia Jewish Film Festival (2018)
 Winner: Audience Award for Best Narrative Feature
 Seattle International Film Festival (2018)
 Winner: Golden Space Needle Award for Best Actor (Miguel Ángel Solá)

References

External links 
 
 

2017 films
2017 drama films
2010s Spanish-language films
Yiddish-language films
2010s Polish-language films
Argentine drama films
Films about Jews and Judaism
Holocaust films
Films set in Argentina
Films set in Spain
Films set in France
Films set in Poland
2017 multilingual films
Argentine multilingual films
2010s Argentine films